Events in the year 1989 in Portugal.

Incumbents
President: Mário Soares
Prime Minister: Aníbal Cavaco Silva

Events
 18 June - European Parliament election.
 17 December - Local election.

Arts and entertainment
Portugal participated in the Eurovision Song Contest 1989 with Da Vinci and the song "Conquistador".

Sports
In association football, for the first-tier league seasons, see 1988–89 Primeira Divisão and 1989–90 Primeira Divisão.

Births
 29 January - Vasco Rocha, footballer
 18 February - Marco António Alemão, software engineer
 31 March - Carlos Manuel Guedes Santos, footballer

References

 
Portugal
Years of the 20th century in Portugal
Portugal